Keith Kennedy (born 5 March 1952) is an English former professional footballer who played as a left back, making over 400 career appearances.

Career
Born in Sunderland, Kennedy played for Newcastle United, Bury, Mansfield Town and Barrow.

References

1952 births
Living people
English footballers
Newcastle United F.C. players
Bury F.C. players
Mansfield Town F.C. players
Barrow A.F.C. players
English Football League players
Association football fullbacks